The McLeod River is a river in west-central Alberta, Canada. It forms in the foothills of the Canadian Rockies, and is a major tributary of the Athabasca River.



Course 
The river begins just outside the eastern border of Jasper National Park, at the confluence of Thornton and Cheviot Creeks.  These creeks are fed by the meltwater on the western slopes of Tripoli and Cheviot Mountains.  The McLeod River then follows the Grave Flats Road, taking on Prospect, Whitehorse, and Cadomin Creeks before emptying into Lac des Roches, south of the town of Cadomin.

The river then snakes through the foothills, and is soon joined by four major tributaries, the Gregg, Erith, Embarrass, and Edson rivers before meeting the Athabasca River near the town of Whitecourt, Alberta.

Planned dam 
Throughout the 1950s and the 1960s the Alberta Government undertook a number of planning studies that discussed diverting water from the Athabasca-Mackenzie watershed to the North and South Saskatchewan Rivers. In 1970, a preliminary engineering report on the McLeod Valley Dam was released by the provincial Department of Agriculture.

The diverted water would have been sent via a canal to Chip Lake. The report read:

"The main embankment would be 5810 feet long with crest elevation at 2780 feet and a maximum height of 140 feet. Dykes, 13,230 feet long and with a maximum height of 15 feet would also be required. Two diversion tunnels, one of which will later be converted to a low level outlet, are proposed to handle river flow during the construction period. A gated ogee crest spillway has been designed with a discharge capacity sufficient to route a 1:500 year flood through the reservoir.

The McLeod Valley Dam, as well as the larger Athabasca-to-Saskatchewan diversion scheme, was shelved in the 1970s due to rising construction costs and environmental concerns.

Tributaries 
Tributaries of the McLeod River, from headwaters to the Athabasca River, include:
Thornton Creek
Cheviot Creek
Prospect Creek
Whitehorse Creek
Drummond Creek, Harlequin Creek
Cadomin Creek
Luscar Creek
Lac des Roches
Watson Creek
Mackenzie Creek
Beaverdam Creek
Taylor Creek, Chief Creek, Thompson Creek, Rainbow Creek
Mercoal Creek
Deerlick Creek
Eunice Creek
Wampus Creek
Mary Gregg Creek
Mary Gregg Lake, Trapper Creek
Antler Creek
McCardell Creek
Gregg River
Berry's Creek, Sphinx Creek, Drinnan Creek, Folding Mountain Creek, Mystery Lake, Warden Creek, Teepee Creek, Wigwam Creek
Anderson Creek
Quigley Creek
McPherson Creek
White Creek
Corral Creek
Embarras River
Mitchell Creek, Baril Creek, Lambert Creek, Neill Creek, Prest Creek, Bryan Creek, Dummy (Hay) Creek
Erith River
Rodney Creek, Raven Creek, Hanlan Creek, Lendrum Creek, Lund Creek, Halpenny Creek, Wickham Creek
Little Sundance Creek
Swartz Creek
Wolf Creek
Edson River
Bench Creek
Trout Creek
January Creek
South Carrot Creek
Lost Creek
Groat Creek
Beaver Creek

See also 
List of Alberta rivers

References 

Rivers of Alberta